Gully Camp Ditch is a  long 1st order tributary to Gum Branch in Sussex County, Delaware.  This is the only stream of this name in the United States.

Course
Gully Camp Ditch rises about 3 miles east of Bridgeville, Delaware and then flows west to join Gum Branch about 2 miles east of Bridgeville.

Watershed
Gully Camp Ditch drains  of area, receives about 45.1 in/year of precipitation, has a topographic wetness index of 610.48 and is about 31% forested.

See also
List of Delaware rivers

References

Rivers of Delaware
Rivers of Sussex County, Delaware
Tributaries of the Nanticoke River